Charles Ferdinand Marks (1852-1941) was a physician and politician in Queensland, Australia. He was a Member of the Queensland Legislative Council.

Politics

Charles Marks was appointed to the Queensland Legislative Council on 8 November 1888. Although a lifetime appointment, he resigned on 6 January 1892, as he was facing bankruptcy proceedings in relation to the RubyAnna sugar company of which he was a partner. However, he was able to satisfy his creditors and was reappointed to the Council approximately two months later on 11 March 1892. He then remained on the Council until it was abolished on 23 March 1922.

Family life
In 1879, Charles Marks married widow Elizabeth Gray Dods (née Stodart), making him the step-father of architect Robin Dods and Government Medical Officer Espie Dods and brother-in-law of James Stodart, a Member of the Queensland Legislative Assembly.  His sons Alexander Marks and Ted Marks both served with distinction in the First World War.

Legacy 
The Charles Marks and Elizabeth Gray Marks Prize is awarded each year to a medical student from the University of Queensland.

References

External links

Members of the Queensland Legislative Council
1852 births
1941 deaths